Uitlander, Afrikaans for "foreigner" (lit. "outlander"), was a foreign (mainly British) migrant worker during the Witwatersrand Gold Rush in the independent Transvaal Republic following the discovery of gold in 1886. The limited rights granted to this group in the independent Boer Republics was one of the contributing factors behind the Second Boer War.

Second Boer War 
 

The vast Witwatersrand gold fields were discovered in 1886, and within ten years the uitlander (English) population of the Transvaal was thought to be double that of the ethnic Boer Transvaalers. These workers were primarily concentrated around the Johannesburg area.

The Transvaal government, under President Paul Kruger, were concerned as to the effect this large influx could have on the independence of the Transvaal. The uitlanders were almost entirely British subjects. Therefore enfranchising the uitilanders, at a time when the Crown was keen to consolidate its colonial hold in South Africa, risked creating a powerful fifth column that could ultimately lead to a power shift and the Transvaal passing into British hands, eventually turning it into a British colony. As a result, beginning in 1890 the Transvaal government passed a series of laws refusing voting rights and citizenship to immigrants who had not both resided the republic for fourteen years and were over forty years of age. This successfully disenfranchised the uitlanders from any meaningful political role.  This attitude was called, "Krugerism".

This policy, together with high taxation, gave rise to considerable discontent. Their treatment served as the pretext for the Jameson Raid in 1895; Cecil Rhodes planned an invasion of the Transvaal to coincide with an uprising of the uitlanders in Johannesburg. Dr Jameson's force invaded, but the expected uprising never took place; the invading force were quickly overpowered and arrested.

From 1897 onwards, the High Commissioner for South Africa, Sir Alfred Milner, and the Colonial Secretary, Joseph Chamberlain, used the denial of rights to the uitlanders as their main point of attack against the Transvaal. They encouraged uitlander agitation and pressed uitlander claims, with veiled threat of war, upon Kruger's government.

In the end, British insistence and Kruger's intransigence led to the outbreak of the Second Boer War in 1899.

Upon its defeat in 1902, the Transvaal became a British colony. All residents of the Transvaal thereafter became British subjects and so the term uitlander lost prominence.

With the election of a liberal government in Britain, everything was returned to the Boers in 1906.

See also
 Boerehaat

Notes

References

Bibliography
 Marais, JS - The Fall of Kruger's Republic, (1961, Clarendon Press)

External links
Imperialism in the dock - the Boer War
The Uitlander Franchise

Second Boer War
South African gold rushes
Boer Republics
South African English
Afrikaans words and phrases
Political terminology in South Africa
British colonisation in Africa